Kirby Bliss Blanton (born October 24, 1990) is an American actress. She is known for her roles as Kirby in the comedy film Project X and as Amy in the horror film The Green Inferno.

Life and career
The youngest of four children, she grew up in The Woodlands, Texas, and started her career doing modeling and commercials in nearby Houston. After doing some month-long stints in Los Angeles, she moved there permanently with her mother. Her first acting role was in the Nickelodeon series Unfabulous in 2004. She also played small parts on shows such as Zoey 101 and Hannah Montana, and landed her first feature film role in 2007's horror film Scar. She later played Kirby in the 2012 comedy film Project X.

In 2014, it was announced that Blanton would be a featured model in Tyler Shields's photography exhibition Provocateur. In 2015, Blanton was named one of the top ten "Houston Scream Queens".

Her first name was given because her parents expected her to be a boy. Her middle name, Bliss, is her mother's maiden name.

Filmography

References

Additional sources

External links
 
 Kirby Bliss Blanton at Yahoo! Movies
 

1990 births
21st-century American actresses
Actresses from Houston
American child actresses
American film actresses
American television actresses
Living people
People from The Woodlands, Texas